Jan Georg Iversen (born 2 March 1956) is a Norwegian cyclist. He was born in Oslo. He competed at the 1976 Summer Olympics in Montreal, where he placed seventh in the 4000 meter individual pursuit.

References

External links

1956 births
Living people
Cyclists from Oslo
Norwegian male cyclists
Olympic cyclists of Norway
Cyclists at the 1976 Summer Olympics